Kulmain is a municipality in the district of Tirschenreuth located north of Kemnath in Bavaria in Germany.

References

Tirschenreuth (district)